Saint Clement, St Clement's or variants may refer to:

People
 Pope Clement I or St Clement of Rome (died c. 98)
St Clement's Day
 Clément of Metz (fl. 4th century), first bishop of Metz
 Clement of Alexandria (c. 150 – c. 215),  Christian theologian and philosopher
 Clement of Ireland (born c. 750), active in the Paris Schools
 Clement of Ohrid (c. 840–916), scholar, writer and enlightener of the Slavs
 Clement Mary Hofbauer (1751–1820), co-founder of the Redemptorists

Places

Canada
 Saint-Clément, Quebec
 St. Clement Parish (Ottawa)
 Rural Municipality of St. Clements, Manitoba
 St. Clements (electoral district)
 St. Clements, Ontario
 St. Clement's School, in Toronto, Ontario

France
 Saint-Clément, Aisne, in the Aisne department
 Saint-Clément, Allier, in the Allier department
 Saint-Clément, Ardèche, in the Ardèche department
 Saint-Clément, former commune of the Calvados department, now part of Osmanville
 Saint-Clément, Cantal, in the Cantal department
 Saint-Clément, former name of the commune of Cabariot (Charente-Maritime)
 Saint-Clément, Corrèze, in the Corrèze department
 Saint-Clément, former commune of the Dordogne department, now part of Saint-Romain-et-Saint-Clément
 Saint-Clément, Gard, in the Gard department
 Saint-Clément, former commune of the Lot department, now part of Cézac
 Saint-Clément, former commune of the Manche department, now part of Saint-Clément-Rancoudray
 Saint-Clément, former commune of the Mayenne department, now part of Craon
 Saint-Clément, Meurthe-et-Moselle, in the Meurthe-et-Moselle department
 Saint-Clément, former commune of the Oise department, now part of Morienval
 Saint-Clément, former commune of the Saône-et-Loire department, now part of Mâcon
 Saint-Clément, Yonne, in the Yonne department
 Saint-Clément-à-Arnes, in the Ardennes department
 Saint-Clément-de-la-Place, in the Maine-et-Loire department
 Saint-Clément-de-Régnat, in the Puy-de-Dôme] department
 Saint-Clément-de-Rivière, in the Hérault department
 Saint-Clément-des-Baleines, in the Charente-Maritime department
 Saint-Clément-des-Levées, in the Maine-et-Loire department
 Saint-Clément-de-Valorgue, in the Puy-de-Dôme department
 Saint-Clément-de-Vers, in the Rhône department
 Saint-Clément-les-Places, in the Rhône department
 Saint-Clément-Rancoudray, in the Manche department
 Saint-Clément-sur-Durance, in the Hautes-Alpes department
 Saint-Clément-sur-Guye, in the Saône-et-Loire department
 Saint-Clément-sur-Valsonne, in the Rhône department

United Kingdom and Channel Islands
 St Clement, Cornwall, England
 St Clement's Isle, Cornwall, England
 St Clement's, Oxford, England
 Terrington St Clement, Norfolk, England
 St Clement's High School
 St Clement, Jersey

Other countries
 Sant Climent de Llobregat, Catalonia, Spain
 St. Clement, Missouri, U.S.
 St. Clement's Island State Park, Maryland, U.S.

Other uses
 St Clement (hymn tune)
 St Clement's Church (disambiguation)
 St Clement's Hospital, London, England
 St. Clements University, Turks and Caicos Islands
 St. Clement S.C., a football club in Jersey

See also

San Clemente (disambiguation)
St. Kliment Ohridski Base, Antarctica
Oranges and Lemons (Say the bells of St. Clement's), a nursery rhyme